The zero-crossing rate (ZCR) is the rate at which a signal changes from positive to zero to negative or from negative to zero to positive. Its value has been widely used in both speech recognition and music information retrieval, being a key feature to classify percussive sounds.

ZCR is defined formally as

In some cases only the "positive-going" or "negative-going" crossings are counted, rather than all the crossings, since between a pair of adjacent positive zero-crossings there must be a single negative zero-crossing.

For monophonic tonal signals, the zero-crossing rate can be used as a primitive pitch detection algorithm. Zero crossing rates are also used for Voice activity detection (VAD), which determines whether human speech is present in an audio segment or not.

See also
 Zero crossing
 Digital signal processing

References

Signal processing
Rates